Alprenoxime is a beta blocker. It is a prodrug to alprenolol.

References

Allyl compounds
Amines
Antihypertensive agents
Beta blockers
Isopropylamino compounds
Ketoximes
Phenol ethers